Marsh Valley High School is a public high school in the Marsh Valley in Bannock County, Idaho, United States,  just north of Arimo. The school is part of the Marsh Valley School Joint District#21. The school's address is 12805 S Old Highway 91 Arimo, Idaho 83214-1613.

Student exchange
 Schlossgymnasium (Castle Grammar School) in Kirchheim unter Teck, Germany

Notable faculty
 Bert Marley, member of the Idaho House of Representatives and Idaho Senate

See also

 List of high schools in Idaho

References

External links
 

Public high schools in Idaho
Schools in Bannock County, Idaho